Sergei Rachmaninoff composed his Piano Concerto No. 1 in F minor, Op. 1, in 1891, at age 17-18 (the first two movements were completed while he was still 17; the third movement and the orchestration were completed shortly after he had turned 18). He dedicated the work to Alexander Siloti. He revised the work thoroughly in 1917.

Instrumentation 
 2 flutes
 2 oboes 
 2 clarinets
 2 bassoons
 4 french horns
 2 trumpets
 3 trombones
 Percussions
 String instruments
 Solo piano

Structure

The work is in three movements:

Overview

First version

This was actually Rachmaninoff's second attempt at a piano concerto. In 1889 he had begun but abandoned a concerto in C minor (the same key, incidentally, in which he would later write his Second Piano Concerto). He wrote Natalya Skalon on 26 March 1891, "I am now composing a piano concerto. Two movements are already written; the last movement is not written, but is composed; I shall probably finish the whole concerto by the summer, and then in the summer orchestrate it" He finished composing and scoring the piece on July 6 and was satisfied with what he had written. The first movement was premiered on 17 March 1892 at the Moscow Conservatoire, with the composer as soloist and Vasily Safonov conducting. This may have been the only time the composer played the concerto in its original form, although Siloti, to whom it is dedicated, programmed it to play himself on several occasions.

Composition students were usually advised to base their efforts on a specific model for their first exercises in new forms. In Rachmaninoff's case this was the Grieg Piano Concerto, which was a favorite work of his and one with which he had been familiar from  Siloti practicing it at the Rachmaninoff household during the spring and summer of 1890 for future concerts. Rachmaninoff adapted the entire musical structure of the outer movements to the Grieg concerto, literally building his music into it. With all his other concertos, Rachmaninoff would prove more enterprising.

Revision and current structure
The public was already familiar with the Second and Third Concertos before Rachmaninoff revised the First in 1917. The First is very different from his later works; in exchange for less memorable melodies, this concerto incorporates elements of youthful vivacity and impetuosity.

The differences between the 1890–1891 original and the 1917 revision reveal a tremendous amount about the composer's development in the intervening years. There is a considerable thinning of texture in the orchestral and piano parts and much material that made the original version diffuse and episodic is removed.

Of all the revisions Rachmaninoff made to various works, this one was perhaps the most successful. Using an acquired knowledge of harmony, orchestration, piano technique and musical form, he transformed the early composition into a concise, spirited work. Nevertheless, he was perturbed that the revised work did not become popular with the public. He said to Alfred Swan, "I have rewritten my First Concerto; it is really good now. All the youthful freshness is there, and yet it plays itself so much more easily. And nobody pays any attention. When I tell them in America that I will play the First Concerto, they do not protest, but I can see by their faces that they would prefer the Second or Third."

Selected recordings

Manuscript version 
 Alexandre Ghindin, pianist, with Vladimir Ashkenazy conducting the Helsinki Philharmonic Orchestra, recorded in 2001 (first recording)

1917 version 
 Sergei Rachmaninoff, pianist, with Eugene Ormandy conducting the Philadelphia Orchestra, recorded in 1941.
 Byron Janis, pianist, with Fritz Reiner conducting the Chicago Symphony Orchestra, recorded in 1957.
 Philippe Entremont, pianist, with Eugene Ormandy conducting the Philadelphia Orchestra, recorded in 1958.
 Sviatoslav Richter, pianist, with Kurt Sanderling conducting the Leningrad Philharmonic Orchestra, recorded in 1959.
 Byron Janis, pianist, with Kirill Kondrashin conducting the Moscow Symphony Orchestra, recorded in 1962.
 Earl Wild, pianist, with Jascha Horenstein conducting the Royal Philharmonic Orchestra, recorded in 1965.
 Tamás Vásáry, pianist, with Yuri Ahronovitch conducting the London Symphony Orchestra, recorded in 1975.
 Peter Rösel, pianist, with Kurt Sanderling conducting the Berliner Sinfonie-Orchester, recorded in 1982.
 Zoltán Kocsis, pianist, with Edo de Waart conducting the San Francisco Symphony Orchestra, recorded in 1983.
 Vladimir Ashkenazy, with Bernard Haitink conducting the Concertgebouw Orchestra, recorded in 1986.
 Mikhail Rudy, with Mariss Jansons conducting the St. Petersburg Philharmonic Orchestra, recorded in 1993.
 Krystian Zimerman, pianist, with Seiji Ozawa conducting the Boston Symphony Orchestra, recorded in 1997.
 Nikolai Lugansky, pianist, with Sakari Oramo and the City of Birmingham Symphony Orchestra, recorded in 2003.
 Stephen Hough, pianist, with Andrew Litton conducting the Dallas Symphony Orchestra, recorded in 2004.
 Leif Ove Andsnes, pianist, with Antonio Pappano conducting the Berliner Philharmoniker, recorded in 2005.
 Boris Berezovsky, pianist, with Dmitri Liss conducting the Ural Philharmonic Orchestra, recorded in 2006.
 Simon Trpčeski, pianist, with Vasily Petrenko conducting the Royal Liverpool Philharmonic Orchestra, recorded in 2010.

Notes

References
Bertensson, Sergei and Jay Leyda, with the assistance of Sophia Satin, Sergei Rachmaninoff: A Lifetime in Music (Washington Square, New York: New York University Press, 1956). Library of Congress Card Catalogue Number 55-10065.
Harrison, Max, Rachmaninoff: life, works, recordings (London and New York:Continuum, 2005). .
Neils, Eiger, notes for ONDINE 977, Sergei Rachmaninoff: Piano Concertos 1 and 4 (Original Versions); Alexander Ghindin, piano, with the Helsinki Philharmonic Orchestra conducted by Vladimir Ashkenazy.
Norris, Geoffrey, ed. Stanley Sadie, The New Grove Dictionary of Music and Musicians (London: Macmillan, 1980), 20 vols. .
Norris, Geoffrey, Rachmaninoff (New York: Schirmer Books, 1993). .

External links

Rachmaninoff's Works for Piano and Orchestra An analysis of Rachmaninoff's Works for Piano and Orchestra including the Piano Concertos and the Paganini Rhapsody

Piano concerto 1
1892 compositions
1917 compositions
Compositions in F-sharp minor